Nathan Holman (born 19 April 1991) is an Australian professional golfer from Melbourne, Australia who plays on the PGA Tour of Australasia, the European Tour, and the Asian Tour. In December 2015, he won the Australian PGA Championship for his first professional victory.

Amateur career
Holman had a successful amateur career and just prior to turning professional he was ranked number two in Australia and number 25 in the world. He played regularly as an amateur on the PGA Tour of Australasia in the last twelve months of his amateur career, including a top 20 finish in the Victorian PGA Championship. He also tied for fifth at the Heritage Classic and tied for second in the Victorian Open.

Professional career
Holman turned professional in October 2013, and his first professional tournament was the Western Australia Goldfields PGA Championship at Kalgoorlie Golf Course from 3–6 October 2013.

In only his fifth professional tournament, in November 2013, Holman made the cut at the 2013 Talisker Masters played at the Royal Melbourne Golf Club and significantly, was tied for the lead at the half-way mark. He went into the final round tied for second, having played the third round with Adam Scott, a player Holman has described as an idol. Although Holman faded in the final round with a 78, he did shoot three sub-par rounds to finish on -3 and 15th place in a tournament field of 120 competitors. He finished 13th on the PGA Tour of Australasia Order of Merit, having finished in the top 25 in six of the seven tournaments he played as a professional.

Holman earned his Asian Tour card for 2014 through Q School and placed 52nd on the Order of Merit, with his best finish a tie for second at the ICTSI Philippine Open. In addition to finishing 34th on the PGA Tour of Australasia Order of Merit, he also played four European Tour events in 2014 and finished 201st in the Race to Dubai as an affiliate member.

Through his Asian Tour membership, Holman earned entry into most of the events co-sanctioned by the Asian and European Tours in 2015, and received invitations to several other European Tour events. In all, he played ten European Tour events in 2015 and finished 135th on the Race to Dubai as an affiliate member. This earned him conditional status on the 2016 European Tour and entry into the final stage of Q School, where he was unable to earn a full card.

In December 2015, Holman earned the first professional win of his career, the Australian PGA Championship, with a par on the first hole of a playoff with Harold Varner III of the United States and Dylan Frittelli of South Africa. The win at a tournament co-sanctioned by the European Tour earned Holman the top spot on the final 2015 PGA Tour of Australasia Order of Merit as well as spots in the 2016 Open Championship at Royal Troon and the 2016 WGC-Bridgestone Invitational. The win also secured Holman's card on the 2016 European Tour just two weeks after he had failed in his bid to secure a spot on that tour via the qualifying school.

Amateur wins
2011 Riversdale Cup, Portsea Open, Victorian Amateur Championship, Southern Open
2012 Master of the Amateurs, Mandurah Open Amateur

Professional wins (1)

European Tour wins (1)

1Co-sanctioned with the PGA Tour of Australasia

European Tour playoff record (1–0)

PGA Tour of Australasia wins (1)

1Co-sanctioned with the European Tour

PGA Tour of Australasia playoff record (1–0)

Results in major championships

CUT = missed the halfway cut

Results in World Golf Championships

"T" = tied

Team appearances
Amateur
Sloan Morpeth Trophy (representing Australia): 2012
Australian Men's Interstate Teams Matches (representing Victoria): 2010, 2011, 2012, 2013

References

External links

Australian male golfers
PGA Tour of Australasia golfers
European Tour golfers
Asian Tour golfers
Golfers from Melbourne
1991 births
Living people